Andria Cathedral (Cattedrale di Santa Maria Assunta) is a Roman Catholic cathedral in Andria in Apulia, Italy, which up to 2009 was in the Province of Bari but from then onwards part of the newly formed Province of Barletta-Andria-Trani. It is dedicated to the Assumption of the Virgin Mary and is the seat of the Bishop of Andria.

Overview
The present cathedral was built by the Norman Geoffrey of Hauteville, lord of Andria, on top of an earlier small church of the 7th-8th century, which forms the present crypt. It received further extensive refurbishment and reconstruction in the mid-14th century in the Late Gothic style, and again later in the Baroque style. The cathedral was severely damaged by a fire in 1916 and was again restored in 1965. The frequent rebuildings have given what is basically a Norman church a predominantly Late Gothic appearance.

The crypt, dedicated to the Holy Saviour (San Salvatore) - unlike the main cathedral, which is dedicated to the Assumption - contains the tombs of two of the wives of Emperor Frederick II, Queen Isabella II of Jerusalem (Yolande) and Isabella of England.

The cathedral owns a gold reliquary of special importance, and two major 19th-century paintings by Michele de Napoli.

Notes

Sources and external links
 Catholic Encyclopedia: Diocese of Andria
 Catholic Hierarchy: Diocese of Andria
 InItalyToday.com: brief description of cathedral and crypt
 Apulia Tourist Board official website: brief description of cathedral and crypt 

Roman Catholic cathedrals in Italy
Cathedrals in Apulia
Churches in the province of Barletta-Andria-Trani
Cathedral
Gothic architecture in Apulia